Maria of Sweden - English also Mary - may refer to:

Maria Eleanor, Queen consort of Sweden 1620
Maria of the Palatinate-Simmern, Swedish princess (consort) 1579
Maria, Princess of Sweden 1588, daughter of King Carl IX (died in infancy)
Maria Elizabeth, Princess of Sweden 1596
Maria Euphrosyne, Princess of Sweden 1654
Maria Pavlovna, Swedish princess (consort) 1908